Wicked! is an Australian animated television series based on the book series of the same name by Paul Jennings and Morris Gleitzman. It was co-produced by Energee Entertainment in Sydney, Australia and France Animation (later known as the MoonScoop Group).

The series is about two step-siblings named Rory and Dawn as they try to protect their own from viruses caused by the Appleman, a man with a head shaped like a half-eaten apple. It was intended as a "comedy of horrors" aimed at children aged 8 to 13.

Wicked! began with 13 short webisodes released on the eKidz website in late 2000. The series ran for 26 episodes and an 80-minute movie. By the end of 2001, it had become Energee Entertainment's most successful series, with over €8 million in sales. However, the producers were unable to continue the series, as Energee shut down in 2002 due to financial losses from its film The Magic Pudding.

In Australia, the series aired on both the Seven Network and the Oh! channel by Optus Television. Internationally, the series was picked up by the BBC in the United Kingdom and TF1 in France.

About 
Dawn and Rory are two step-siblings who live with their newlywed parents in a small Australian town called Terngabbie. They find themselves terrorized by the Appleman, a mysterious evil scientist with a head shaped like an eaten apple. He is infected with a virus and plans to contaminate everything around him with the help of his mutants.

Characters 

 Dawn is a redheaded girl who lost her mom in a bus accident. She likes sports and video games, but she has some trouble in school, where she is failing science and gets bullied by Tori and Tiffany. Dawn and her new stepbrother Rory are always bickering, but they find themselves forced to work together to stop the Appleman's schemes.
 Rory is a smart brown-haired boy whose parents got a divorce. His biological dad mysteriously vanished years ago, but Rory receives a package from him on the day of his mother's wedding. The package has an apple-headed doll inside, and it is later revealed that the Appleman himself is Rory's dad.
 The Appleman is the main villain. He lives in his lab, hidden deep within an abandoned refinery full of animals that he treats as his minions. He has a rotten apple for a head and wears a suit with a blue tie. The Appleman's goal is to make others miserable by contaminating things with his virus, which feeds off of negative emotions.
 Jack is Dawn's dad and Rory's stepdad. He works as a sheep shearer.
 Eileen is Rory's mum and Dawn's stepmum who drives a motorcycle. She works as a mail courier.
 Gramps is Dawn's grandfather. He is a veteran of World War II and often helps Dawn and Rory.
 Tori and Tiffany are Dawn's bratty rivals at school. Tori has dirty blonde hair and wears green, while Tiffany has dark brown hair and wears pink.

Episodes

References 

2000 Australian television series debuts
2001 Australian television series endings
2000s Australian animated television series